Cubix Robots for Everyone: Showdown is a 2002 action-adventure role-playing video game released by Blitz Games. The game is based on the Cubix: Robots for Everyone television series. It is developed by Blitz Games, produced by 4Kids Entertainment, Daewon Media, and Cinepix and published by The 3DO Company.

Summary 
Players control Connor or Abby to collect 25 Cubix robots from the television series to use in turn-based combat. The game consists of Story, Battle, Challenges, Tournament, and Mini-Game modes.

Development
The game's console versions were originally intended to be released in September 2002, but were delayed to June 2, 2003.

Reception

Cubix Robots for Everyone: Showdown received mixed reviews from critics. It holds a 57.33% rating on GameRankings based on 3 reviews GMR rated the game a 5 of 10 saying Most of the game plays out like "Pokémon" with bad wiring.

References

External links

2001 video games
Action-adventure games
Game Boy Color games
Game Boy Advance games
GameCube games
North America-exclusive video games
PlayStation 2 games
The 3DO Company games
Video games developed in the United Kingdom
Video games based on animated television series
Multiplayer and single-player video games
Video games based on television series
Blitz Games Studios games